Olle Kullinger (born 5 August 1974) is a Swedish retired footballer.

He was born in Uppsala in 1974, and started his career in IF Vindhemspojkarna. Later on he represented Enköpings SK in Superettan, Halmstads BK in Allsvenskan, IF Brommapojkarna in Superettan and IK Sirius. He retired from football in 2007.

External links
 SVFF profile

1974 births
Living people
Footballers from Uppsala
Association football forwards
Swedish footballers
IF Brommapojkarna players
Halmstads BK players
Allsvenskan players